Aleksandr Nikolayevich Mikhailov ( 15 September 1951 – 4 December 2020) was a Russian politician, who served as governor of Kursk Oblast and a member of the State Duma (1993–2000). 

He graduated from S.M. Kirov Kharkov Institute of Railway Transport Engineers (now Ukrainian State University of Railway Transport) in 1974. He was a member of the Communist Party of the Russian Federation until 2004, and since 2005 affiliated with the governmental United Russia party. He was elected governor of Kursk Oblast in 2000 and resigned in 2018.

In 2010, Mikhailov became involved in a controversy over antisemitic remarks.

References

1951 births
2020 deaths
Governors of Kursk Oblast
United Russia politicians
21st-century Russian politicians
First convocation members of the State Duma (Russian Federation)
Second convocation members of the State Duma (Russian Federation)
Third convocation members of the State Duma (Russian Federation)
Members of the Federation Council of Russia (after 2000)